I Choose Noise is the third studio album by British progressive breakbeat band Hybrid, released on 4 September 2006 by Distinct'ive Records. The album included recorded symphonic sequences by the Seattle Session Orchestra, and was produced in collaboration with composer Harry Gregson-Williams.

Background
The album was released in the UK on 4 September 2006 and in the United States on 10 October 2006. Although a bonus disc featuring Hybrid's live show at God's Global Gathering was intended to be included, it was omitted due to time constraints and may be released separately. Hybrid's track "Sleepwalking" was also originally intended for I Choose Noise, but was omitted because it was felt not to fit into the album. The track did not become available until four years after it was originally produced, with the release of the album Re_Mixed.

I Choose Noise is the only studio album by Hybrid not to be released on vinyl. However, due to popular demand, several tracks from the album were also released on 12" vinyl singles. The three releases were "Dogstar", "Falling Down", and "Dream Stalker". By 15 December 2006, all three were available through the Distinct'ive Records website.

Track listing

Remixes
 "Dogstar" was remixed by Satellite Party under the name "Wish Upon a Dogstar".
 "Dream Stalker" was remixed by Satellite Party. The track is called "Kinky".
 "Last Man Standing" & "Until Tomorrow" were remixed and released under the name Last Man Standing / Until Tomorrow Remixes.
 "I Choose Noise" was remixed by Elite Force and has been released (along with a remix of "Sleepwalking") under the name I Choose Noise / Sleepwalking Remixes.

Personnel 

Stephen Barton – piano, orchestration, assistant
Toby Chu – assistante engineer
Peter DiStefano – guitars
Perry Farrell – vocals, vocal effect
Meri Gavin – assistant engineer
John D. Graham – vocals
Tom Greenwood – electric guitar
Harry Gregson-Williams – producer, conductor, orchestration
Kirsty Hawkshaw – vocals
Chris Healings – keyboards, programming, engineer, mixing
Peter Hook – bass
Tim Hutton – bass, drums
Hybrid – producer
Simon James – contractor
Costa Kotselas – assistant engineer
Kory Kruckenberg – digital editing
Mal Luker – engineer
Gretchen O`Neal – production supervisor
Robert Puff – music copyist
David Sabee – contractor
Jon Schluckebier – stage manager
Tony Scott – speech
Adam Taylor – acoustic guitar
Martin Tillman – electric cello
Mike Truman – guitar, keyboards, programming, engineer, mixing
Judie Tzuke – vocals

Trivia
 I Choose Noise was misprinted in the CD liner notes as "I Chose Noise".
 "Choke" and "Keep It in the Family" were featured in the trailers for the 2008 film The Spirit.
 "Dream Stalker" features voiceover from the audio commentary for Domino by director Tony Scott, for whom Hybrid have co-produced three film soundtracks.
 "Just for Today" was featured as the opening theme of The Frantic Assembly's production of Othello'.
 "Just for Today" is also used in the 2011 video game Saint's Row: The Third where it plays during the freefalling segment of the mission Air Steelport.
 "Everything is Brand New" was included as a digital download bonus track.
 Several tracks from I Choose Noise were previewed on the rare Scores album, released a year previously. "Dream Stalker" and "Keep it in the Family" appear on both albums, but are titled differently on Scores (as "Outta Time" and "What Lies Beneath" respectively). Elements of "Dogstar" are also used in the Scores track, "Hearts Desire", which was later retitled "Hooligan" and appears on the Cinematic Soundscape disc of the Classics'' box set.

Charts

References

External links

2006 albums
Hybrid (British band) albums
Distinct'ive Records albums